Powerful Women of Wrestling (also known as POWW) was a women's professional wrestling promotion based out of Indianapolis, Indiana founded by David McLane, founder of Gorgeous Ladies of Wrestling and Women of Wrestling.

History
After David McLane left Gorgeous Ladies of Wrestling (GLOW), he returned to Indianapolis and created Powerful Women of Wrestling (POWW). Many wrestlers left GLOW due to pay disputes and joined McLane's new POWW promotion under altered ring names. Unlike GLOW (which focused on comedy, variety, and skits), POWW focused more on actual wrestling. POWW was aligned with World Wrestling Association in Indianapolis and their titles were sometimes referred to as the WWA Women's Championship and WWA Women's Tag Team Championship. They were also briefly aligned with the American Wrestling Association during 1989. That same year, many of the POWW wrestlers were featured in the 1989 film American Angels- Baptism of Blood. The promotion closed the following year in 1990.

Alumni

Bambi (Selina Majors)
Brandi Mae (Trudy Adams) - Formerly "Amy the Farmer's Daughter" in GLOW
Candi Devine (Candace Rummel)
Coal Miner's Daughter (Donna Spangler)
Danya
Destiny
Devila
Essence - Formerly "Envy" in GLOW
Futura (Kathleen Blair)
Genie Beret / Jeanie Beret (Laura Fisher) - Formerly "Attache" in GLOW
Goldie Rae (Ursula Hayden) - Formerly "Babe the Farmers Daughter" in GLOW
Heidi Lee Morgan
Hot Rod Andie - Formerly "Angel" in GLOW
Insanity - Formerly "Dementia" in GLOW
Katie Kincaid
Kimmie Kozak
Lady Soul/Essence - Formerly "Envy" in Glow
Liberty (Susan Phelan)
Lock (Winona Barkley)
Luna Vachon (Gertrude Vachon)
Madusa Miceli (Debra Miceli)
Malibu (Jane Hamlin) - Formerly "California Doll" in GLOW
Natasha the Russian (Noelle Rose) - Also "Major Tanya" in GLOW
Nina (Lisa Moretti) - Formerly "Tina Ferrari" in GLOW
Paisley
Passion
Peggy Lee Leather
Pocahontas
Polynesian Princess
Princess Jasmine (Cynthia Peretti) - Formerly "Pepper" in GLOW
Queen Kong (Dee Booher) - Formerly "Matilda the Hun" in GLOW
Rockin' Rebel (Robin Kelly) 
Sasha the Russian (Michelle Duze) - Formerly "Dementia" & "Sugar" in GLOW
Shannon O'Brien
Susie Steele
'The Syrian Terrorist' Pali Al-Azar Rashan Yerovich (Janeen Jewett) - Formerly "Palestina" in GLOW
Thora the Barbarian (Ann Marie Cosgrove)
Tiffany Crystal (Natalie Will) 
Wendi Richter

Championships

POWW Championship
Natasha the Russian was the first POWW Champion. She lost the title on the second TV episode. Nina was the second POWW Champion. She lost the title to Sasha the Russian, but later regained it. The title was also referred to as the WWA Women's Championship.

Belt design
Initially, the title was a crown worn by the champion and was referred to as the "POWW Crown". Eventually the crown was replaced by a white sash belt with metal studs spelling the words "POWW Champion" fastened on the sash.

POWW Tag Team Championship
Luna Vachon and Hot Rod Andie defeated The Blonde Bombshells (Brandi Mae and Malibu) to become the first POWW Tag Team Champions. The titles were also referred to as the WWA Women's Tag Team Championship.

References

External links

POWW and GLOW matches

1987 American television series debuts
1990 American television series endings
Independent professional wrestling promotions based in the Midwestern United States
Women's professional wrestling promotions
Professional wrestling in Indiana